Future Kings may refer to:

Future Kings of Spain, a rock band and their self-titled debut album
The Future Kings of England, a rock band and their self-titled album
"Future Kings", a song by Reks on his album The Greatest X
Inhumans: Once & Future Kings, a comic book series centering on the fictional superhero group the Inhumans